Burger Street is an American fast food restaurant chain specializing in hamburgers and chicken sandwiches. , the chain has 14 locations in the Dallas–Fort Worth metroplex and 4 locations in the greater Tulsa, Oklahoma, area.

Overview
Burger Street was started by Bill Waugh, creator of the Taco Bueno, Casa Bonita, and Crystal's Pizza restaurant chains. The first restaurant, built in Lewisville, Texas, opened in 1985. Most locations are a small building with drive-up windows on both sides.

See also
 List of hamburger restaurants

References

External links
Official website

Restaurants established in 1985
Fast-food hamburger restaurants
Companies based in Dallas
1985 establishments in Texas